Pavel Cherkasov (born 13 May 1972) is a Russian cyclist. He competed in the men's cross-country mountain biking event at the 2000 Summer Olympics.

References

External links
 

1972 births
Living people
Russian male cyclists
Olympic cyclists of Russia
Cyclists at the 2000 Summer Olympics
Sportspeople from Bryansk